Betty Kwan Chinn (關惠群) is a philanthropist who lives in Eureka, California. She has helped the homeless—including the mentally ill, disabled veterans, runaways, and drug abusers—since the 1980s. She won the 2008 Minerva Award. She used the $25,000 grant as seed money and worked with the Society of Saint Vincent de Paul to establish the homeless a bathroom and kitchen. U.S. President Barack Obama awarded her and 12 others the Presidential Citizens Medal on August 4, 2010 at the White House.

The Betty Kwan Chinn Day Center opened November 16, 2013 offering a variety of services for the poor and homeless.

In 2020, the Betty Kwan Chinn Foundation has stopped receiving donation items due to the coronavirus pandemic. The foundation offers 100 free packed meals on weekdays at its Eureka-based center.

References

External links
BettyChinn.org
Minerva-Award-Winner-Betty-Chinn Oprah.com: Minerva Award Winner—Betty Chinn

American philanthropists
American people of Chinese descent
Presidential Citizens Medal recipients
People from Eureka, California
Living people
Homelessness activists
Year of birth missing (living people)